Neptis alta, the old sailer or high sailer, is a butterfly in the family Nymphalidae. It is found in Senegal, Guinea, Sierra Leone, Liberia, Ivory Coast, Ghana, Nigeria, Cameroon, the Republic of the Congo, the southern part of the Democratic Republic of the Congo, Uganda, Kenya, Tanzania, Zambia, Malawi, Mozambique, Zimbabwe and northern Botswana. The habitat consists of Brachystegia woodland.

Adult males mud-puddle in the dry season. Adults are on wing from August to October and again from April to May.

References

Butterflies described in 1955
alta